Hong Lok Yuen is a low-density luxury residential housing estate in Tai Po District, New Territories, Hong Kong, located near Cloudy Hill. It is north of Tai Po Town.

History
Hong Lok Yuen was previously an orchard owned by General Li Fulin. It is reputed to have excellent feng shui.

Hong Lok Yuen was approved for development in 1977 as a new garden estate. The developing company Hong Lok Yuen Property Co Ltd a joint venture between Wong, a well known architect, and Winpole International Ltd (永保國際有限公司) with Sun Hung Kai Properties also later participating in the development. Hong Lok Yuen was sub-divided into a total of 1196 units between 1980 and September 1993.

The estate
Most of the units are  two to three storey independent villas with garages and gardens. Hong Lok Yuen is one of the few large-scale bungalow-style luxury residential areas in Hong Kong and has attracted many officials and artists as residents. There is a shopping centre, clubhouse and international school, International College Hong Kong, located in the estate.

Incidents
 "The Three Corpse Robbery Case" - No. 135, 10th Street, Hong Lok Yuen - On 28 September 1982, between about 9:30 am to 11:30 am a 32-year-old renovation worker entered the house to burgle it but was discovered by a resident. The suspect afraid of being arrested killed the 33-year-old housewife and her 8-year-old daughter and 4-year-old son. He strangled the three with wires and ties and placed the bodies in the storage room and bathroom. The suspect stole HK$4000 yuan, a gold chain, a diamond ring, golden cufflink, a bead necklace, a women's handbag  and a bank safety deposit box key. The murder was discovered at 20:10 when the male head of the household returned home from work. Then incident was one infamous events of the year. The suspect left Hong Kong on the day of the killing, but returned on 5 October, and was arrested by the police on 16 October. On 14 June 1983 at trial in the High Court of Hong Kong, the defendant denied three charges of murder and one charge of robbery. On 27 June seven male jurors unanimously found the defendant guilty. The judge Michael Wong Kin Chow sentenced the murderer to death for three counts of murder, and to the maximum penalty for robbery of life imprisonment. The judge denounced the inhuman and cold-blooded nature of the killing saying it was difficult to describe the behaviour using pen and ink and the defendant must be completely isolated from society. In November 1966, Hong Kong had ceased carrying out the death penalty following the United Kingdom. The sentence was, therefore, commuted and the defendant was sentenced to life imprisonment by a Hong Kong judge.
 The Hong Lok Yuen International School was sued for adverse possession of land used by the Man family for ancestral halls that is used by the school as a playground and flower garden.
 No. 8, Second Street, Hong Lok Yuen. In December 2014, a 33-year-old female tenant hanged herself in the toilet inside the house, making the house a death home. Afterwards the unit became difficult to sell. It was placed auction with an initial reserve price of HK$33.8 million. The house was eventually sold for a 40% discount at HK$20 million.

Well-known residents

 Chiang Chen (蔣震)
 Gordon Siu (蕭炯柱)
 Ronny Tong (湯家驊)
 Sam Hui (許冠傑)
 Cecilia Cheung (張柏芝)
 Jordan Chan (陳小春)
 Leo Ku (古巨基)
 Miriam Yeung (楊千嬅)
 Chapman To (杜汶澤) and his wife Kristal Tin (田蕊妮)
 Mary Jean Reimer (翁靜晶)

Transportation
Hong Lok Yuen has a shuttle bus service (NR51) for residents that travels to Tai Wo station on the MTR East Rail line, Tai Po Town Centre and Tai Po Market. 

The following buses also stop at Hong Lok Yuen bus stop located on the Tai Po Road - Tai Wo Section about 300 metres walk from the entrance to the estate:

64P, 64K, 65K, 73, 73A, 74C, 74D, N73

The following red minibuses also stop on Tai Po Road - Tai Wo Section. 

Sheung Shui to Castle Peak route
Sheung Shui to Jordan Road route (24 hours)
Sheung Shui to Mong Kok route (on demand)
Sheung Shui to Causeway Bay route (night service)
Kwun Tong to Lok Ma Chau route

District Council Seat
Because Hong Lok Yuen does not have sufficient population for a seat, it is in the same electorate as Sha Lo Tung, and other villages.

Note: There are other minor adjustments (including numbering) in the above main areas. Please refer to the relevant district board election constituency boundary map and entries.

See also
 Fairview Park (Hong Kong)
 Palm Springs (Hong Kong)

Further reading

References

Tai Po District